William Saint Galvano (born April 16, 1966) is an American Republican politician from Florida. He represented parts of Bradenton area in the Florida Senate from 2012 to 2020 and in the Florida House of Representatives from 2002 to 2010. He served as President of the Senate in his last two years in office.

History
Galvano was born in Liberty, New York, and moved to the state of Florida in 1969, where he was a student at Sebring High School. He then attended Manatee Community College, where he received his associate degree in 1986, and then the University of Florida, graduated with his bachelor's degree in political science in 1989. Following graduation, Galvano attended the University of Miami School of Law, and was awarded his Juris Doctor in 1992. After working in private practice for several years as an associate attorney, he became a partner at Grimes Hawkins Gladfelter & Galvano, a law firm in Bradenton.

Florida House of Representatives
In 2002, when incumbent State Representative Mark G. Flanagan was unable to seek re-election due to term limits, Galvano ran to succeed him in the 68th District, which was based in western Manatee County and included a small segment of southern Hillsborough County. He faced Brian Murphy, an optometrist; Benjamin Milks, a Cedar Hammock Fire Control District Commissioner; and David Miner, an attorney, in the Republican primary. Galvano campaigned on his support for providing a clean-up fund to deal with the fallout from phosphate mining operations attracting more federal dollars to the state, reforming the state's charter school program by requiring a "parental contribution" for families who use vouchers, strengthening corporate fraud laws, enacting a clear air policy statewide, and providing "community-based care" for children in foster care. Although the Sarasota Herald-Tribune praised Galvano's candidacy as "appealing on several key issues", including his "keener interest in environmental protection" and growth management, they ultimately endorsed Murphy, citing his "greater breadth of leadership experience." Ultimately, however, Galvano defeated his opponents by a fairly wide margin, winning 46% of the vote to Murphy's 31%, Milks' 13%, and Miner's 10%. He advanced to the general election, where he was opposed by Arlene Sweeting, the Democratic nominee, and James Wallace, the Libertarian nominee. During the general election, he attacked Sweeting's platform, noting, "She wants to do a lot of things for everybody. The question is: Where will the money come from?" He called for the implementation of zero-based budgeting in light of the state's revenue shortfalls. The Herald-Tribune endorsed Galvano in the general election, noting that, despite the fact that both candidates are "thoughtful, well-versed on the issues, and deeply involved in their community," Galvano's "more practical, fiscally conservative approach" would help create a "moderate, bipartisan consensus in Tallahassee." Owing to the conservative nature of the district, Galvano won his first term in a landslide, defeating Sweeting and Wallace with 62% of the vote.

He was re-elected without opposition in 2004, 2006, and 2008. When he was unable to seek a fifth term in 2010 due to term limits, he was succeeded by Jim Boyd.

Florida Senate
When the state's legislative districts were redrawn, Galvano opted to run in the newly created 26th District, which included the district that he previously represented in the House. He was unopposed in the Republican primary and advanced to the general election, where he faced the Democratic nominee, Paula House, an attorney. Galvano campaigned on a platform of lowering the corporate tax rate and eventually phasing it out, supporting the state's charter school system, and connecting the coast with light rail, while House criticized Galvano for siding with special interests. Galvano was endorsed by The Bradenton Herald, the Tampa Bay Times, and the Tampa Tribune, with the Herald praising the "depth of his legislative and leadership experience, the strength of his commitment to public service and his principled approach to issues," the Times noting his "better grasp of the region," and the Tribune citing his "reputation as a reasonable, thoughtful lawmaker." He ended up defeating House by a solid margin, winning his first term in the Senate with 59% of the vote to her 41%.
 
He was re-elected to his second term in 2014 without opposition, and was named the Senate Majority Leader for the 2014-2016 Senate term. Additionally, in anticipation of his re-election in 2018, Galvano circulated pledge cards from Senators in an effort to be elected President of the Florida Senate that year.

Galvano's district was reconfigured and renumbered after court-ordered redistricting in 2016.

Along with Governor Rick Scott and Representative Jose Oliva, in 2018 Galvano pushed for the passage of Florida's most restrictive gun control in 20 years. In 2018, Galvano's Political Action Committee received a large donation from the Michael Bloomberg-funded gun control advocacy group Everytown for Gun Safety. Senator Galvano "has said repeatedly he would not apologize for accepting the funds and that he was grateful for the support from Bloomberg". Since receiving this large monetary contribution from the Bloomberg affiliated groups, Senator Galvano pushed for tougher gun control measures.
 
In 2020, he opened the last session of his term as president of the Florida Senate.

Galvano was term-limited in 2020 and was again succeeded by Jim Boyd.

References

External links
Florida House of Representatives - Bill Galvano
Galvano for State Senate
Grimes Goebel Grimes Hawkins Gladfelter & Galvano, PL. - William S. Galvano
Florida Senate moves forward with plan to arm teachers, narrowly rejects assault weapons ban

|-

|-

|-

|-

1966 births
21st-century American politicians
Republican Party Florida state senators
Living people
Republican Party members of the Florida House of Representatives
People from Liberty, New York
State College of Florida, Manatee–Sarasota alumni
University of Florida alumni
University of Miami School of Law alumni